Innocence is a studio album by American pianist Kenny Barron which was recorded in 1978 and first released on the Wolf label.

Track listing

Personnel 
Kenny Barron – keyboards
Jimmy Owens – trumpet (tracks 4 & 5)
Sonny Fortune – alto saxophone (tracks 1-3)
Buster Williams – bass (tracks 1-3)
Gary King – electric bass (tracks 4 & 5)
Brian Brake (tracks 4 & 5), Ben Riley (tracks 1-3) – drums
 Rafael Cruz (tracks 1-3), Billy Hart (tracks 4 & 5) - percussion

References 

Kenny Barron albums
1978 albums
Albums produced by Joel Dorn